Arthur Norman Holcombe (born November 3, 1884 Winchester, Massachusetts – December 9, 1977) was an American political scientist and educator who taught at Harvard University from 1910 until his retirement in 1955. He was known for his studies of government structure.

Life
He received a BA at Harvard University in 1906 and a Ph.D. in 1909.  On August 30, 1910, he married Carolyn H. Crossett. They had five children. In 1964, he married Hadassah Moore Leeds Parrot.

Holcombe split his career between public service and teaching. He was president of the American Political Science Association in 1936. He was credited with establishing political philosophy and theory as basic disciplines in Harvard University’s government curriculum, where he was Professor of government, from 1910 to 1955. Among his students were John F. Kennedy, Henry Kissinger and Henry Cabot Lodge.

In 1949, he assisted Chiang Kai-shek in the drafting of a constitution for the Republic of China. In 1955, he retired as Eaton Professor of the Sciences of Government to become chairman of the committee to Study the Organization of Peace, an affiliate of the American Association for the United Nations.

Works

   (reprint 2008) On Internet Archive HERE
 
 Arthur N. Holcombe, The Middle Classes in American Politics (Cambridge, Mass: Harvard University Press,  1940).  Reprinted: de Gruyter The Middle Classes in American Politics.

References

Notes

External links
"Book Review: A Strategy of Peace in a Changing World", The Academy of Political Science, B. S. Murty, 1970

20th-century American educators
Harvard University alumni
Harvard University faculty
1884 births
1977 deaths
20th-century American historians
20th-century American male writers
Bancroft Prize winners
American male non-fiction writers